ATUC may refer to:

 Azerbaijan Trade Unions Confederation, a national trade union centre in Azerbaijan
 African Trade Union Congress, a former Rhodesian and Zimbabwean trade union federation
 Aden Trade Union Congress, a former trade union in South Yemen

See also 
 Atuc, a village in Azerbaijan
 Atuk